Free Nationals are an American R&B band formed in Los Angeles, California. The group consists of José Ríos (lead guitar, backing vocals), Ron "T.Nava" Avant (keyboard, rhythm guitar, backing vocals), Kelsey Gonzales (bass guitar, bass synth) and Callum Connor (drums, percussion, backing vocals). They frequently accompany Anderson .Paak as his backing band.

History 
Guitarist José Ríos and keyboardist Ron Avant met Anderson .Paak while studying at Musicians Institute in Hollywood, California in the late 2000's. Kelsey and Callum joined them soon after and they formed the Free Nationals. The band went on to produce for Anderson and frequently tour with him. The idea for their name came from their mentor Shafiq Huisayn. Free Nationals is a term which means the first settlers of America before Columbus came, the people indigenous to the land. They took their own interpretation of this, being 'indigenous to the music' by paying homage to the influential musicians before them.

Their performance with Paak at his NPR Tiny Desk Concert in August 2016 is possibly their most significant appearance to date. The YouTube video of which has amassed over 92 million views so far, making it the most popular video in the Tiny Desk series.

The band released their debut single "Beauty & Essex" featuring Daniel Caesar and Unknown Mortal Orchestra on October 9, 2018. Their second single  "Time" featuring Mac Miller and Kali Uchis, released on June 12, 2019, was the first official posthumous song from Miller since his death in September 2018. On December 13, 2019, they released their self-titled debut album through OBE and Empire Distribution. It was nominated for Best Progressive R&B album at the 63rd Annual Grammy Awards.

Musical style and influence 
Their music has been described as having a "future retro, funky and soulful sound". The band state that they 'stay indigenous to the funk' by paying tribute to their inspirations who include legendary musicians Stevie Wonder, B.B. King, Herbie Hancock and Al Green.

Members 
 José Ríos – lead guitars, backing vocals
 Ron "T.Nava" Avant – keyboards, synthesizers, talkbox, rhythm guitars, lead and backing vocals
 Kelsey Gonzalez – bass guitar, bass synth, backing vocals
 Callum Connor – DJ, drums, percussion, backing vocals

Discography

Studio albums

Singles

Guest appearances

Awards and nominations

Grammy Awards

!
|-
|2021
| Free Nationals
| Best Progressive R&B Album 
| 
| style="text-align:center;"|
|-
|}

References

External links 
 Official website
 Free Nationals documentary

Musical groups from Los Angeles
American contemporary R&B musical groups